The 1989 Autoworks 500 was a NASCAR Winston Cup Series race that took place on November 5, 1989, at Phoenix International Raceway in Avondale, Arizona.

Race report
Five of the most dominant drivers of the 1989 NASCAR Winston Cup Series season were Dale Earnhardt (average finish 10th place), Rusty Wallace (average finish 10th place), Mark Martin (average finish 11th place), Darrell Waltrip (average finish 12th place), and Bill Elliott (average finish of 13th place).

The first caution was for a dog on the track on lap 48.

Bill Elliott defeated Terry Labonte by six car lengths in front of 63,000 spectators. Three hundred and twelve laps were run on the paved oval spanning  in two hours and fifty-seven minutes. Five cautions occurred for 24 laps. Forty-three drivers competed in this race; the only foreign competitor was Canadian Roy Smith. Butch Miller would finish last due to an engine problem on lap 16.

Richard Petty only finished 42nd once, in this race. He did finish worse on two occasions in races with larger fields (55th at Charlotte in 1960 due to being disqualified and 57th at Daytona in 1959 due to an early engine failure).

An incident occurred during this race that sparked some controversy. Wallace was leading and coming up on the lapped car of #90 Stan Barrett on lap 254. Barrett’s car made contact with Wallace in turn one, causing it to veer right and slam into the outside wall. Wallace’s car was damaged but still in racing condition. He would lose a lap. The next week the Missouri native won his first and only championship over Dale Earnhardt.

Alan Kulwicki led the most laps in the race. Bobby Hamilton would make his Winston Cup debut in this race and was performing astoundingly, taking the lead from Geoff Bodine on lap 209. Five laps after he took the lead going into turn 3. However, the engine let go, spraying oil and parts all over the track, ending his day. He was possibly heading toward winning in his debut. Hamilton qualified in fifth place using a "movie car" from the 1990 motion picture Days of Thunder, which was sponsored by Exxon and driven by the fictional driver Rowdy Burns (Michael Rooker).

This was the final career race for car owner Leroy Throop.

Qualifying

Failed to qualify:  Tommy Ellis (#18), Danny Lawson (#41), Bob Howard (#89), Keith Van Houten (#35), Mark Walbridge (#07), Jack Sellers (#44), Robert Sprague (#19), Butch Gilliland (#24), St. James Davis (#22), Bob Walker (#80), Rick McCray (#08), John Krebs (#99), Duke Hoenshell (#38), Hershel McGriff (#04), Rick Scribner (#50)

Finishing order
Section reference: 

 Bill Elliott
 Terry Labonte
 Mark Martin
 Darrell Waltrip
 Dale Jarrett
 Dale Earnhardt
 Dick Trickle
 Harry Gant
 Michael Waltrip
 Jimmy Spencer
 Alan Kulwicki
 Morgan Shepherd
 Ken Schrader
 Derrike Cope
 Dave Marcis
 Rusty Wallace
 Jim Sauter
 Bobby Hillin Jr.
 Brett Bodine
 Joe Ruttman
 Kyle Petty
 Lake Speed
 Hut Stricklin
 Larry Pearson
 Jimmy Means
 Bill Schmidt
 Rodney Combs
 Geoffrey Bodine*
 Ricky Rudd*
 Sterling Marlin*
 Stan Barrett*
 Bobby Hamilton*
 Ernie Irvan*
 Neil Bonnett*
 Ron Esau*
 Bill Sedgwick*
 Phil Parsons*
 Greg Sacks*
 Davey Allison*
 Rick Wilson*
 Roy Smith*
 Richard Petty*
 Butch Miller*

* Driver failed to finish race

Standings after the race

References

Autoworks 500
Autoworks 500
NASCAR races at Phoenix Raceway